Ali Tandoğan (born 25 December 1977) is a Turkish former football player and coach who was most recently the manager of Altay S.K.

Honours 
Beşiktaş
Turkish Cup (2): 2005–06, 2006–07
Turkish Super Cup (1): 2006

Bursaspor
Süper Lig (1): 2009–10

References

External links
 
 Ali Tandoğan at TFF

1977 births
Living people
People from Salihli
Turkish footballers
Turkey international footballers
Turkey B international footballers
Turkey under-21 international footballers
Turkey youth international footballers
Denizlispor footballers
Gençlerbirliği S.K. footballers
Beşiktaş J.K. footballers
Süper Lig players
Bursaspor footballers
Antalyaspor footballers
Mersin İdman Yurdu footballers
TFF First League players
Association football midfielders